Estadio José Bernardo Pérez is a multi-use stadium in Valencia, Venezuela. It opened on October 8, 1955, and holds 15,500 people.

Originally named Estadio Cuatricentenario, it primarily served as the home stadium for the Industriales de Valencia baseball club. Prior to the 1965–1966 season, the ballpark was renamed in honour of José Bernardo Pérez, a prominent local athlete.

It is currently used mostly for baseball games and serves as the home of the Navegantes del Magallanes.  The stadium co-hosted the 2006 Caribbean Series.

Image Gallery

References
:es:Estadio José Bernardo Pérez.Wikipedia.org
WorldStadiums.com

Jose Bernardo Perez
Jose Bernardo Perez
1955 establishments in Venezuela
Buildings and structures in Valencia, Venezuela